Bloomington Rail Trail is a 2-mile multi-use gravel path in Bloomington, Indiana. It connects with the B-Line Trail at Country Club Drive and Clear Creek Trail at Church Lane. Benches and a drinking fountain are located at the intersection with Country Club Drive intersection. Trailheads are located on Country Club Drive, Tapp Road, That Road, and Church Lane. Trees border much of the trail used by runners, walkers and cyclists. In March 2018, the city of Bloomington closed a portion of the trail for several days in order to remove invasive species of plants (Asian bush honeysuckle and wintercreeper).

In 2019, an extension south called the Limestone Greenway trail was constructed. It crosses Dillman Rd and ends in a dead end, separated by a farm property from Victor Pike.

References 

Bloomington, Indiana
Hiking trails in Indiana